The National Economic and Development Authority (NEDA) is an independent cabinet-level agency of the Philippine government responsible for economic development and planning. It is headed by the president of the Philippines as chairman of the NEDA board, with the Secretary of Socioeconomic Planning as vice-chairman. A number of Cabinet members, the Governor of the Bangko Sentral ng Pilipinas, the Chairperson of the Metropolitan Manila Development Authority, the Chief Minister of Bangsamoro, the Secretary of Information and Communications Technology, the Chairman of the Subic–Clark Area Development Corporation, and the National President of the Union of Local Authorities of the Philippines are members of the NEDA Board.

The agency has been headed by Arsenio Balisacan since June 30, 2022.

History and precursor agencies

National Economic Council 
On November 15, 1935, the Commonwealth of the Philippines was inaugurated with Manuel L. Quezon as president, Sergio Osmeña as vice president, and a unicameral National Assembly as the Legislature. One of the first acts of Quezon administration was to call for a special session of Congress to enact certain laws needed by the government. Under Commonwealth Act No. 2, enacted on December 23, 1935, an advisory body for economic concerns of the Philippines called the National Economic Council was tasked with advising the government on economic and financial matters, and formulate an economic program based on national independence. The president was authorized to appoint its respective members with the consent of the Commission on Appointments of the National Assembly.

The year following its creation, the National Economic Council was organized on February 14, 1936, composed of its inaugural members – the Secretary of Finance (who served as chairman), the Secretary of Agriculture and Commerce, the chairman of the Board of Directors of the Philippine National Bank, the President of the National Development Company, the President of the Manila Railroad Company, Mr. Joaquin M. Elizalde, Hon. R.J. Fernandez, Mr. Wenceslao Trinidad, Mr. Vicente Madrigal, Hon. Francisco Varona, Mr. Ramon Soriano, Hon. Vicente Singson Encarnacion, Hon. Rafael R. Alunan and Hon. Manuel Roxas.

The council was organized into eight committees: (1) Committee on agriculture and natural resources, (2) industry, (3) foreign trade and tariff, (4) domestic trade, (5) transportation and communication, (6) taxation, (7) labor and immigration, and (8) banking and finance. The first act of the council was to survey and adopt plans for an effective utilization and conservation of our natural resources. The council also undertook a study, in cooperation with the National Development Company and Metropolitan Water District, on the potential of water power resources which eventually led to the enactment of Commonwealth Act No. 120, creating the National Power Corporation.

After World War II, the First Congress of the Philippines enacted Republic Act No. 51, which allowed the President of the Philippines to reorganize the Executive Branch of Government as he sees fit within one year of its enactment. President Manuel Roxas, subsequently, amended the Administration Code of 1917 by issuing Executive Order No. 94, s. 1947. The Executive Order made the President of the Philippines the head of the National Economic Council.

During his administration, President Carlos P. Garcia saw the need to create a new office in charge of the supervision of government corporations, which he called the National Development Authority. President Garcia asked Congress to enact such a law during his 1958 State of the Nation Address. When Congress finally passed the law creating the National Development Authority, President Garcia disagreed with its limited powers, thus vetoing the bill sent to him as he mentioned in his 1959 State of the Nation Address

In 1960, Congress passed a law, which changed the composition of the National Economic Council through Republic Act No. 2699 enacted on June 18, 1960. The law increased the council's membership by including the Secretary of Commerce and Industry and granting the minority party representation in the membership of the National Economic Council. The council would continue to perform its functions throughout the Third Republic until the declaration of Martial Law on September 23, 1972.

National Economic Development Authority 
The need for an office in charge of national development was revived during the administration of President Ferdinand E. Marcos. In his 1970 State of the Nation Address, Marcos said the administrative machinery of government must be restructured and revitalized to meet the challenge of change and development. Marcos, thereafter, crafted a government reorganization plan which included a National Economic Development Authority and submitted it to Congress for their approval.

In 1972, the National Economic Development Authority (without the conjunction “and”) was created as the government's central planning body. The first major thrust of the government-wide reorganization effected through Presidential Decree (P.D.) No. 1 issued on September 24, 1972, otherwise known as the Integrated Reorganization Plan (IRP), was the provision for an integrated organizational complex for development planning and program implementation to correct the deficiencies of the system then existing. The IRP identified these deficiencies as: (1) the dispersal of planning functions among several economic planning bodies and ad hoc councils; (2) the lack of effective coordination among economic bodies; (3) the weak link between plan formulation and program execution; (4) the need to improve the capacity for sectoral and regional planning. The decree merged the National Economic Council and the Presidential Economic staff, created by Executive Order No. 8, s. 1966, and renamed it to the National Economic Development Authority. President Marcos subsequently issued Presidential Decree No. 1-A which delineated the composition of the National Economic Development Authority.

National Economic and Development Authority 
In 1973, the National Economic Development Authority was dissolved by virtue of Presidential Decree No. 107, s. 1973. The Presidential Decree created the National Economic and Development Authority (now, with the conjunction “and”), which absorbed the National Economic Development Authority as mandated in the 1973 Constitution.

On March 12, 1986, after the February 1986 revolution, Executive Order (EO) No. 5 was issued by President Corazon C. Aquino, directing a government-wide reorganization to promote economy, efficiency and effectiveness in the delivery of public services.

On July 22, 1987, Executive Order No. 230 was issued reorganizing the NEDA. The implementation of this EO was completed on February 16, 1988, when the NEDA commenced operations under its reorganized setup.

List of NEDA Director-Generals and Socioeconomic Planning Secretaries

Governing Law 

The present form of the NEDA was organized by President Corazon C. Aquino on July 22, 1987, through Executive Order No. 230.  It defined the composition of the NEDA Board and the Secretariat and its powers and functions, the powers and functions of the Authority and its committees.

On July 26, 1994, President Fidel V. Ramos signed Memorandum Order No. 222 which reactivated the NEDA Board Executive Committee and mandating that the decisions of the NEDA Board Executive Committee shall be final, executory and binding upon the NEDA Board.

On July 27, 1992, president Ramos signed Republic Act No. 7640, which constituted the Legislative-Executive Development Advisory Committee (LEDAC).  The LEDAC serves as a consultative and advisory body to the President as the head of the NEDA and gives advice on certain programs and policies, which are essential to the realization of the goals of national development.

NEDA Board 
The powers and functions of the NEDA reside in the NEDA Board.  It is the Philippines' premier social and economic development planning and policy coordinating body.  The Board is composed of the President as chairman, the Secretary of Socio-Economic Planning and NEDA Director-General as vice-chairman, and the following as members: the Executive Secretary and the Secretaries of Finance, Trade and Industry, Agriculture, Environment and Natural Resources, Public Works and Highways, Budget and Management, Labor and Employment, and Interior and Local Government.

The following have since been added as members to the Board: the Secretaries of Health, Foreign Affairs, and Agrarian Reform (per Memorandum Order No. 164, dated March 21, 1988); the Secretary of Science and Technology (per Memorandum Order No. 235, dated May 19, 1989); and the Secretary of Transportation and Communications (per Memorandum Order No. 321, dated September 26, 1990).  In addition, the Secretary of Energy (per Republic Act No. 7638, approved December 9, 1992) and the Governor of the Bangko Sentral ng Pilipinas (per Section 124 of Republic Act No. 7653, approved June 14, 1993).

On April 22, 2006, the NEDA Board was reconstituted through Administrative Order No. 148, adding eight new members and replacing five original members.

On October 20, 2017, President Rodrigo Duterte issued Administrative Order No. 8, s. 2017, reconstituting the present NEDA Board, which is composed of the following as of June 30, 2022:

The Board is assisted by six Cabinet-level inter-agency committees:
Development Budget Coordination Committee (DBCC)
Infrastructure Committee (InfraCom)
Investment Coordination Committee (ICC)
Social Development Committee (SDC)
Committee on Tariff and Related Matters (CTRM)
Regional Development Committee (RDCom)
National Land Use Committee (NLUC)

Further, Section 34, Article VII of Republic Act 11054: Bangsamoro Organic Law, provides that the Chief Minister of the Bangsamoro Region shall be an Ex-Officio Member of the NEDA Board on matters concerning the Bangsamoro Region.

National Innovation Council

Other Offices 

The Legislative-Executive Development Advisory Council (LEDAC) Secretariat.
The Legislative Liaison Office (LLO)

Attached Agencies 

Commission on Population and Development (POPCOM),
Tariff Commission (TC),
Public-Private Partnership (PPP) Center,
Philippine National Volunteer Service Coordinating Agency (PNVSCA),
Philippine Statistics Authority (PSA),
Philippine Statistical Research and Training Institute (PSRTI), and
Philippine Institute for Development Studies (PIDS).

Moreover, the Philippine Institute for Development Studies (PIDS) is attached to the NEDA for policy and program coordination or integration.

See also
Philippines–Australia Community Assistance Program

References

External links 

 About NEDA

Economy
Economic development organizations
Government agencies established in 1972